José Alejandro Méndez (born 28 March 1993) is an Argentine professional footballer who plays as an attacking midfielder for Chacarita Juniors.

Career
Méndez began his career in 2014 with Jorge Newbery, he participated in seventeen matches and scored four times before making the move to join Primera B Nacional team Independiente Rivadavia a year later. He managed three goals in thirty-six matches for Independiente. In 2016, Méndez joined Primera División side Atlético Tucumán on loan. His debut came in an 8 February win against Racing Club at the Estadio Monumental José Fierro. He returned to Independiente in July 2017 after Tucumán chose not to sign him permanently. Méndez left for Mexico in June 2018 by signing for Ascenso MX's Tampico Madero.

After scoring goals against Leones Negros and Zacatepec across twenty-three appearances, as they suffered relegation, Méndez agreed his departure from Tampico Madero on 29 June 2019 to Primera B Nacional's Almagro.

Career statistics
.

References

External links
 

1993 births
Living people
Sportspeople from Mendoza Province
Argentine footballers
Association football midfielders
Association football wingers
Argentine expatriate footballers
Primera Nacional players
Argentine Primera División players
Ascenso MX players
Independiente Rivadavia footballers
Atlético Tucumán footballers
Tampico Madero F.C. footballers
Club Almagro players
Atenas de San Carlos players
Deportivo Maipú players
Chacarita Juniors footballers
Expatriate footballers in Mexico
Expatriate footballers in Uruguay
Argentine expatriate sportspeople in Mexico
Argentine expatriate sportspeople in Uruguay